Bahar Çağlar Ökten (born 28 September 1988) is a Turkish professional basketball player for Botaş SK. She competed at two Summer Olympic Games: the 2012 and 2016. Married to the advocate Emin Ökten since 29 August 2020.

Honors
 Galatasaray
EuroLeague Women
Winners: 2013–2014
EuroCup Women
Winners: 2008–2009
Turkish Basketball Super League
Winners: 2013–2014, 2014–2015
Turkish Cup
Winners: 2009–2010, 2010–2011, 2011–2012, 2012–2013, 2013–2014
Turkish Presidents Cup
Winners: 2008, 2011
 Yakın Doğu Üniversitesi
EuroCup Women
Winners: 2016–2017
Turkish Basketball Super League
Winners: 2016–2017
Turkish Cup
Winners: 2016–2017, 2017–2018
Turkish Presidents Cup
Winners: 2017

See also
Turkish women in sports

References

External links

Profile at galatasaray.org
Profile at tbl.org.tr
Player Profile at Eurobasket Women 2009
Official Website of the Bahar Çağlar Ökten

1988 births
Living people
Sportspeople from İzmir
Turkish women's basketball players
Galatasaray S.K. (women's basketball) players
Beşiktaş women's basketball players
Small forwards
Basketball players at the 2012 Summer Olympics
Basketball players at the 2016 Summer Olympics
Olympic basketball players of Turkey